Cosmosoma salvini is a moth of the subfamily Arctiinae. It was described by Arthur Gardiner Butler in 1876. It is found in Panama and Costa Rica.

References

salvini
Moths described in 1876